Sentencing disparity is defined as "a form of unequal treatment in criminal punishment that is often of unexplained cause and is at least incongruous, unfair and disadvantaging in consequence".
In the United States men are most adversely affected by sentencing disparity being twice as likely to be sentenced to jail after conviction than women and receiving on average 63% longer jail sentences.

Terminology
Colloquially, situations wherein some criminals receive lighter criminal sentences or are held to a lesser standard of personal accountability is referred to as a slap on the wrist. The verbified form of such unequal treatment may be termed wrist slap, and alternative forms such as wristslap and wrist-slap. As an adjective, such a justice system may be described as being two-tiered or hybrid, both usually with negative connotations. Lawyers who uphold such unfair principles within the legal system are sometimes designated with pejorative terms such as double standardist.

Instances wherein women or cases have been perceived as upholding a gender disparity in sentencing have at times been labelled with derogatory terms such as pussy pass.

Overview
There is a distinct difference between differences that arise due to legitimate use of discretion in the application of the law and those differences that arise due to discrimination or other, unexplained, causes unrelated to the issues found in the specific criminal case. There is evidence that some U.S. federal judges give much longer prison sentences for similar offenses than other judges do.

This is a major problem because two judges could be faced with a similar case and one could order a very harsh sentence while another would give a much lesser sentence. A 2006 study by Crow and Bales gives evidence of sentencing disparity. The Florida Department of Corrections gave statistics of those prisoners who received probation or community control in the period 1990–1999. Prisoners were categorized as Blacks and Hispanics or Whites/Non-Hispanics. The study found that the Blacks and Hispanics received more intense and harsher penalties than the White/Non-Hispanic group.

Evidence
A 2001 University of Georgia study found substantial disparity in the criminal sentencing that men and women received "after controlling for extensive criminological, demographic, and socioeconomic variables".  The study found that in US federal courts, "blacks and males are... less likely to get no prison term when that option is available; less likely to receive downward departures [from the guidelines]; and more likely to receive upward adjustments and, conditioned on having a downward departure, receive smaller reductions than whites and females".

In 2005 Max Schanzenbach found that "increasing the proportion of female judges in a district decreases the sex disparity" in sentencing which he interprets as "evidence of a paternalistic bias among male judges that favors female offenders".

In 2006 Ann Martin Stacey and Cassia Spohn found that women receive more lenient sentences than men after controlling for presumptive sentence, family responsibilities, offender characteristics, and other legally relevant variables, based on examination of three US district courts.

In 2012 Sonja B. Starr from University of Michigan Law School found that, controlling for the crime, "men receive 63% longer sentences on average than women do," and "[w]omen are…twice as likely to avoid incarceration if convicted", also based on data from US federal court cases.

Racism and sexism
Some prison reform and prison abolition supporters have argued that race and gender are both valid reasons for disparity in sentencing. In 2016, Mirko Bagaric argued that African-Americans and Indigenous Australians should receive a sentencing discount in all but the most serious of crimes, in part to offset unacknowledged biases to the opposite effect, while women should "be treated more leniently when they commit the same crime as a man" - in this case, he did not make any exception for serious offending. In the United Kingdom, Jean Corston's 2007 report planned as a "review of women with particular vulnerabilities in the criminal justice system" is described as making the case "that prisons should be scrapped for all but a tiny number of women", which Corston justified on the basis "equality does not mean treating everyone the same". She proposed "Custodial sentences for women must be reserved for serious and violent offenders who pose a threat to the public" and that overt separate sentencing for men and women could be considered after then-pending equality legislation. Some feminists argue that giving women lighter sentences is infantilizing, based on stereotyping, and incompatible with gender equality.

See also 

 Focal concerns theory
 Men's rights
 Misandry
 Sentencing

References

External links 

 Crow, M.S., Bales, W. (2006). Sentencing guidelines and focal concerns: The effect of sentencing policy as a practical constraining on sentencing decisions. American Journal of Criminal Justice, 30(2)
 Rhodes, W.M., et al. (2016). Federal sentencing disparity: 2005-2012. Washington, DC: Bureau of Justice Statistics.
 Kathryn Hopkins, Noah Uhrig, and Matt Colahan (2016) Associations between being male or female and being sentenced to prison in England and Wales in 2015. Ministry of Justice Analytical Services, UK

Misandry
Racism
Sentencing (law)
Sexism